The 2019 LA Galaxy OC season is the club's second season, and second season in United Women's Soccer.  LA Galaxy OC play their home matches at Championship Soccer Stadium in the Orange County Great park in Irvine, California. The team finished 2nd in league play and won the UWS National title defeating Calgary Foothills WFC 1-0 in the final on July 21, 2019 at Mount Royal University in Calgary, Alberta, Canada.

Competitions

Player Stats

Goaltending statistics

References

LA Galaxy